Hameh Sin (also Romanized as Hameh Sīn and Hamasīn; also known as Torkaman and Torkaman Deh-e Hamsīn) is a village in Siyahrud Rural District, in the Central District of Tehran County, Tehran Province, Iran. At the 2006 census, its population was 982, in 269 families.

References 

Populated places in Tehran County